The International Conference of Reformed Churches (ICRC) is a federation of Reformed or Calvinist churches around the world. The ICRC was founded in 1981. The ICRC convenes international meetings every four years. Its theology is more conservative than the larger World Communion of Reformed Churches and is similar to that of the World Reformed Fellowship. The participating churches endorse the Reformed confessions (Heidelberg Catechism, Belgic Confession, Canons of Dort and the Westminster Confession of Faith). Moderator of the ICRC is Rev. Dr Dick Moes.

List of members 
List of ICRC Members

 Africa Evangelical Presbyterian Church (AEPC)
 Associate Reformed Presbyterian Church
Canadian and American Reformed Churches
Christian Reformed Churches in the Netherlands
Christian Reformed Churches of Australia
Evangelical Presbyterian Church in England and Wales
Evangelical Presbyterian Church (Ireland)
Free Church of Scotland
Free Church of Scotland (Continuing)
Free Church in Southern Africa
Free Reformed Churches of North America
Free Reformed Churches of South Africa
Gereja-Gereja Reformasi Calvinis (Indonesia)
Gereja-Gereja Reformasi di Indonesia
Independent Reformed Church in Korea
Heritage Reformed Congregations (North America)
Orthodox Presbyterian Church (North America)
Presbyterian Church of Eastern Australia
Presbyterian Church in Korea (Koshin) (South Korea)
Presbyterian Free Church of Central India
Presbyterian Church in Uganda
Reformed Church in the United States
Reformed Churches in the Netherlands (Liberated) (membership suspended as of July 2017)
Reformed Churches of New Zealand
Reformed Churches of Brazil (Igrejas Reformadas do Brasil)
Reformed Churches in Spain
Reformed Churches in South Africa
Reformed Presbyterian Church of India
Reformed Presbyterian Church of Ireland
Reformed Presbyterian Church of North America
Reformed Presbyterian Church North East India
Sudanese Reformed Churches (SRC) General Synod
 United Reformed Church in Congo
United Reformed Churches in North America

References

External links 
 

International bodies of Reformed denominations
Orthodox Presbyterian Church
Christian organizations established in 1982